Snarky Puppy is an American jazz fusion band led by bassist Michael League. Founded in 2004, Snarky Puppy combines a variety of jazz idioms, rock, world music, and funk and has won five Grammy Awards. Although the band has worked with vocalists, League described Snarky Puppy as "a pop band that improvises a lot, without vocals".

History
The band was formed as a 10-piece group by Michael League in Denton, Texas, after his second year at the University of North Texas, in 2004, “Because I was so bad,” he claimed, “I didn't place into any of the school ensembles. So Snarky Puppy was my way of getting to play.” The group has grown into an international super-band made up of "...a wide-ranging assemblage of musicians known affectionately as 'The Fam'." In more than 17 years since its founding, about 40 players have performed in "The Fam" on guitar, bass, keyboards, woodwinds, brass, strings, drums, and percussion, but six of the 10 members on the first studio album The Only Constant remain on the regular roster. Many past and present band members were students at the University of North Texas.

Members have performed with Erykah Badu, Marcus Miller, Justin Timberlake, Stanley Clarke, Kirk Franklin, Ari Hoenig, Roy Hargrove, David Crosby,  Michael McDonald, Snoop Dogg, The 1975 and many other artists. While touring, the band has given clinics, workshops, and master classes in North America, South America, Europe, Asia, and Australia, and most members either lead or are primary players in other working recording bands.

In 2005, League self-released the band's unofficial first album Live at Uncommon Ground. Snarky Puppy's next three albums were released independently, after which Tell Your Friends, groundUP, Family Dinner: Volume One, and We Like It Here were released on the band's GroundUP imprint on Ropeadope.

The album We Like It Here was performed and recorded live in October 2013 at the artistic compound Kytopia in Utrecht, Netherlands.

On January 26, 2014, Snarky Puppy and vocalist Lalah Hathaway won a Grammy Award in the Best R&B Performance category for their rendition of the Brenda Russell song "Something" from Family Dinner – Volume 1. Sylva debuted at number one on the Billboard magazine Heatseekers Chart, the Jazz Album chart, and the Contemporary Jazz Album chart. The album won the 2016 Grammy Award for Best Contemporary Instrumental Album. The album Culcha Vulcha (2016) won the 2017 Grammy Award for Best Contemporary Instrumental Album. Friday 26 April 2019, the band released the first bonus track from Immigrance. Immigrance is the latest evolution of the band as League noted to David Browne in Rolling Stone: “We’re more into setting up nice grooves that we like and sitting with things a bit longer.”

Although the band had recorded several albums with a small audience of friends, family, and guests in the studio with them, its first true "live, in-concert" album was Live at the Royal Albert Hall recorded before a sold-out crowd at the historic London venue. The album won the 2021 Grammy Award for Best Contemporary Instrumental Album.

A second "live, in-concert" album, "Live at GroundUP Music Festival" was released in the Spring of 2022. The album consists of a single performance from each of the GroundUP Music Festival's first four seasons, none of which had been included in the "Live at the Royal Albert Hall" album. 

In March 2022, the band recorded their album Empire Central at the Deep Ellum Art Company in Dallas, Texas. The album won the 2023 Grammy Award for Best Contemporary Instrumental Album.

Label
With the release of the album GroundUP in 2012, Snarky Puppy started its own imprint, GroundUP Music, on Ropeadope Records. It was inspired by the idea of helping lesser-known artists capitalize on Snarky Puppy's growing fanbase. In 2016, GroundUP Music left Ropeadope and partnered with Universal Music for three years of releases and is now a fully independent label. It has released albums by David Crosby, Snarky Puppy, Becca Stevens, Bokanté, Banda Magda, Alina Engibaryan, Charlie Hunter, Breastfist, Sirintip, Mark Lettieri, House of Waters, PRD Mais, Roosevelt Collier, Forq, Lucy Woodward, The Funky Knuckles, Michelle Willis, Cory Henry, Justin Stanton, Bill Laurance, and Maz.

GroundUP Music Festival 
In 2017, the GroundUP Music Festival, also known as GUMFest, debuted within the grounds of the North Beach Band Shell in North Beach, Miami. The first GroundUP Music Festival was initiated by Andy Hurwitz, directed by Paul Lehr, and artistically directed by Michael League. The festival features performances by Snarky Puppy all three nights, with a line-up curated by League that has featured Michael McDonald, Cecile McLorin Salvant, David Crosby, Béla Fleck and the Flecktones, The Wood Brothers, Robert Glasper, Knower, Concha Buika, C4 Trio, Pedrito Martinez, Jojo Mayer + Nerve, Mark Guiliana's Beat Music, John Medeski's Mad Skillet, Charlie Hunter Trio, Laura Mvula, Eliades Ochoa, Esperanza Spalding, Lionel Loueke, Joshua Redman, Terence Blanchard, Christian Scott aTunde Adjuah, Maro, and Brian Blade and the Fellowship Band as well as the full GroundUP Music roster, among others. Through February 2020 (and prior to the effects of the COVID-19 pandemic), GroundUP Music Festival, Miami, had become an annual event.

Band members
Snarky Puppy is sometimes referred to as a "collective." The band's current roster boasts about 19 members, and well over 40 musicians have performed with the group over the years and through the group's 14 albums. Michael League explains that, in the early days of the original 10-piece band, if someone got an opportunity to earn more money than for the band's gig, "...we'd get a substitute and if the substitute played well, then it felt like, 'Well, they learned the music and played great, what a waste for them to learn all that for one gig...' so we would kind of just keep them in the Rolodex, so to speak, and rotate them in and out. Then it became a thing where we started touring so much that guys couldn't do all the dates, or didn't want to, or whatever." When people came in, the differences in their playing would influence all those on the date. "That would change the way that they played the music. And then even when that new person left, that memory of that new relationship with the music would remain. So really we just kept building on the personalities of the new people that would come in, brick by brick. ...in general, the guys understand what the band is– a rotating cast... But I don't really think of Snarky Puppy as a collective. It's just a large band and sometimes people aren't there. It doesn't feel like a revolving door, it doesn't feel anonymous at all. The guys who have played gigs with us the least have still played several hundred gigs. That's more than most people play with their own bands. So it's very much a tight, familial unit. Everyone feels very, very close and very essential, also."

Members listed on the notes of album Immigrance (2019):
 Michael League – bass guitar, oud, percussion
 Jay Jennings – trumpet, flugelhorn
 Mike Maher – trumpet, flugelhorn
 Chris Bullock – tenor and soprano saxophones, bass clarinet, flute, alto flute, bansuri, percussion
 Bob Reynolds – tenor saxophone
 Zach Brock – violin
 Bill Laurance – piano, keyboards
 Shaun Martin – keyboards
 Bobby Sparks II – keyboards
 Justin Stanton – keyboards, trumpet
 Bob Lanzetti – guitars
 Mark Lettieri – guitars
 Chris McQueen – guitars
 Larnell Lewis – drums
 Jamison Ross – drums
 Jason "JT" Thomas – drums
  – percussion
 Nate Werth – percussion
 Marcelo Woloski – percussion

Awards and honors
 2013 Grammy Award for Best R&B Performance, "Something"
 2013 Best Electric/Jazz-Rock/Contemporary Group/Artist,  JazzTimes Readers' Poll
 2013 Best New Artist, JazzTimes Readers' Poll
 2015 Best Electric/Jazz-Rock/Contemporary Group/Artist, JazzTimes Critic' Poll
 2015 Grammy Award for Best Contemporary Instrumental Album, Sylva
 2015 Jazz Group of the Year, DownBeat Readers' Poll
 2016 Jazz Group of the Year, DownBeat Readers' Poll
 2016 Best Electric/Jazz-Rock/Contemporary Group/Artist, JazzTimes Readers' Poll
 2016 Grammy Award for Best Contemporary Instrumental Album, Culcha Vulcha
 2017 Best Electric/Jazz-Rock/Contemporary Group/Artist, JazzTimes Readers' Poll
 2017 Jazz Group of the Year, DownBeat Readers' Poll
 2018 Best Electric/Jazz-Rock/Contemporary Group/Artist, JazzTimes Readers' Poll
 2019 Jazz Group of the Year, DownBeat Readers' Poll
 2021 Grammy Award for Best Contemporary Instrumental Album, Live At The Royal Albert Hall
 2023 Grammy Award for Best Contemporary Instrumental Album, Empire Central

Discography 
 Live at Uncommon Ground (self-release, 2005) - live
 The Only Constant (Sitmom, 2006)
 The World Is Getting Smaller (Sitmom, 2007)
 Bring Us the Bright (Sitmom, 2008)
 Tell Your Friends (Ropeadope, 2010) – recorded in 2009
 groundUP (GroundUP, 2012) - live
 Amkeni with Bukuru Celestin (Ropeadope, 2013)
 Family Dinner – Volume 1 (Ropeadope, 2013)
 We Like It Here (Ropeadope, 2014) – live recorded in 2013
 Sylva with Metropole Orkest (Impulse!, 2015) – live recorded in 2014
 Family Dinner – Volume 2 (GroundUP, Universal Music Classics, 2016) – live recorded in 2015
 Culcha Vulcha (GroundUP, 2016)
 Immigrance (GroundUP, 2019)
 Live at the Royal Albert Hall (GroundUP, 2020)[2CD] – live recorded in 2019
 Live at GroundUP Music Festival (GroundUP/Spotify, 2022) – live
 Empire Central (GroundUP, 2022)[2CD]

References

External links
 Official website

American jazz ensembles from Texas
Grammy Award winners
Musical groups established in 2004
Musical groups from Denton, Texas
Musical groups from Brooklyn
Jazz fusion ensembles
Jazz musicians from Texas
GroundUPmusic artists
Ropeadope Records artists
Impulse! Records artists
Jazz musicians from New York (state)